György Pál (born 29 March 1939) is a Hungarian boxer. He competed in the men's light welterweight event at the 1960 Summer Olympics.

References

External links
 

1939 births
Living people
Hungarian male boxers
Olympic boxers of Hungary
Boxers at the 1960 Summer Olympics
Martial artists from Budapest
Light-welterweight boxers